William Leonard Reed (known as Will Reed) (16 October 1910 – 15 April 2002) was an English classical composer and pianist.

Life
Reed was educated at Dulwich College and Jesus College, Oxford, obtaining a degree in Literae Humaniores in 1933 and a diploma in education in 1934.  Whilst still at Oxford, he won a composition prize for a sonata for violin and piano, and Sir Hugh Allen (Professor of Music at Oxford) recommended that he should study at the Royal College of Music.  Reed studied composition with Herbert Howells and conducting with Constant Lambert.  He travelled to Scandinavia on a scholarship in 1936, meeting the Finnish composer Jean Sibelius, and lectured in Scandinavia on behalf of the British Council in 1936 and 1937.  In 1939, he obtained a D Mus degree from the University of Oxford.

From his time at Oxford onwards, he was a member of the Oxford Group (which later became Moral Re-Armament), an international moral and spiritual movement.  He wrote reviews for the group during the Second World War, and travelled and composed extensively for them between 1940 and 1960.  He became Director of Music at Westminster Theatre Arts Centre in 1966, the group's London venue, and ran a series of successful concerts there.  He was a lecturer for the Workers' Educational Association from 1973 to 1997. He died on 15 April 2002.

Works
Penelope Thwaites described Reed's compositional style as "quintessentially English", with inspiration from Howells and John Ireland mixed with "spiky dissonance". His pieces include the following:
Homage to Delius, for string sextet (1934) – Reed was passionate about the music of Frederick Delius
Recitative and Dance Op.1 for orchestra (1934) – performed with Sir Malcolm Sargent conducting
Fantasy for flute, viola and harp (1934)
Scherzo Op.16 for orchestra (1937)
Three Surrey Impressions Op.10 for two pianos (1935) – Reed was an accomplished pianist himself
Piano Trio Op.27 (1941–1943) – broadcast by the BBC to mark his 90th birthday
Doctor Johnson's Suite Op.29 for string quartet (1944)
Concert Suite Op.39 for piano (1946–1947)
Suite "The Top Flat" for viola and piano, Op.41 (1947)
The Good Road (1947) – music for a Moral Re-Armament theatre production
Suite No.3 (Mountain House) Op.43a for orchestra (1949) – performed by the Suisse Romande Orchestra – originally written for violin and piano (1949)
Concert Overture Op.44 for orchestra (1943–1950)
Carol for East and West (1952) – written for Moral Re-Armament
The Vanishing Island (1955) – music for a Moral Re-Armament theatre production
The Crowning Experience (1957) – music for a Moral Re-Armament theatre production
Concert Waltz Op.49 for piano (1977)
Festive March Op.34a for orchestra (1978) – originally written for piano (1945)

Reed also published collections of vocal music, such as The Golden Book of Carols (1948), The Treasury of Vocal Music (1969), and editions of National Anthems of the World (1978 to 2002) with Michael Jamieson Bristow.

References

External links

Will Reed's Google Site

1910 births
2002 deaths
People educated at Dulwich College
Alumni of Jesus College, Oxford
Alumni of the Royal College of Music
English classical composers
20th-century classical composers
English classical pianists
Male classical pianists
English male classical composers
20th-century classical pianists
20th-century English composers
British male pianists
20th-century British male musicians
20th-century British musicians